This is a list of units in the New Zealand Air Training Corps.

Each unit is led and managed by the Cadet Unit Commander, and their officers and staff.

There are currently 49 Air Training Corps units in New Zealand.

Former Units

See also 
New Zealand Air Training Corps

New Zealand Cadet Forces

References 

Air Training Corps, New Zealand
New Zealand Air Training Corps
New Zealand military-related lists